Sad Café is the fourth studio album by English rock band Sad Café, released in October 1980 by RCA Records.

Release
In the UK, two singles were released, "La-Di-Da" and "I'm in Love Again" both of which charted on the UK Singles Chart. On some editions of the album, "Love Today" and "I'm in Love Again" are swapped around on the track listing.

The album failed to continue the success of the band's previous album and it charted at number 46 on the UK Album Charts. It was also certified silver by the BPI in February 1981. In the US, the album was released by Swan Song Records and it charted at number 160 on the Billboard 200.

The album was reissued on CD in 2009 in the US by Renaissance Records.

Reception
Reviewing the album for Record Mirror, Paul Sexton described it as "more of the same. Which is fine, as the band is still relatively young... and there's so much diversity in their music, that it'll take quite a while before they come to the bottom of that particular well. The album doesn't feature any ballads in the form of 'Every Day Hurts', and probably for that reason, won't spawn any hits that big. But 'La Di Da' is already making an impression, and it's indicative of the midpace, happy/sad ambivalence the band specialises in." "It's also good to see vocalist Paul Young, the band's chief lyricist, being able to vary the content of his lyrics, and providing a contrast to the usual love-gone-right and love-gone-wrong fodder".

Track listing

Personnel
Sad Café
 Paul Young – lead vocals, percussion, congas
 Ashley Mulford – lead guitar, slide guitar, vocals
 Ian Wilson – electric guitar, acoustic guitar, vocals, percussion
 John Stimpson – bass guitar, vocals
 Vic Emerson – piano, synthesizer
 Dave Irving – drums, vocals, percussion
 Lenni Zaksen – saxophone, vocals

Technical
 Eric Stewart – engineer, producer
 Alwyn Clayden – art direction
 Vic Emerson – strings arrangement and synthesisation
 Lenni Zaksen – horns arrangement
 John Shaw – photography
 Recorded at Strawberry Studios South in Dorking and mastered at Strawberry Mastering in London

Charts

References 

1980 albums
Sad Café (band) albums
Albums produced by Eric Stewart
Albums recorded at Strawberry Studios
RCA Records albums
Swan Song Records albums